Deitingen railway station is a railway station in the municipality of Deitingen, in the Swiss canton of Solothurn. It is an intermediate stop on the standard gauge Jura Foot line and is served by local trains only.

Before the modification of the station around 1998, there were both a western and an eastern siding for freight and infrastructure movements. When those were dismantled, all the switches were removed as well.

Services 
 the following services stop at Deitingen:

References

External links 
 
 

Railway stations in the canton of Solothurn
Swiss Federal Railways stations